Arif Dirlik (23 November 1940 – 1 December 2017) was a Turkish-American historian who published on historiography and political ideology in modern China, as well as issues in modernity, globalization, and post-colonial criticism. Dirlik received a BSc in Electrical Engineering at Robert College, Istanbul in 1964 and a PhD in History at the University of Rochester in 1973.

Biography
Dirlik came to the United States to study science at University of Rochester, but developed an interest in Chinese history instead. His PhD dissertation on the origins of Marxist historiography in China, published by University of California Press in 1978, led to an interest in Chinese anarchism. When asked in 1997 to identify the main influences on his work, Dirlik cited Marx, Mao, and Dostoevsky.

After his official retirement, Dirlik lived in Eugene, Oregon. In fall 2011 he held the Rajni Kothari Chair in Democracy at the Centre for the Study of Developing Societies in Delhi, India. In fall 2010, he served as the Liang Qichao Memorial Distinguished Visiting Professor at Tsinghua University, Beijing. He held a brief appointment as Green Professor at the University of British Columbia in February 2016.

Career
Dirlik taught at Duke University for thirty years as professor of history and anthropology before moving in 2001 to the University of Oregon where he served as Knight Professor of Social Science, Professor of History and Anthropology, and Director of the Center for Critical Theory and Transnational Studies. He subsequently accepted a short-term appointment as Chair Professor of Chinese Studies, Professor by Courtesy of the Departments of History and Cultural Studies, and Honorary Director of the Chinese University of Hong Kong-Chiang Ching-kuo Foundation Asia Pacific Center for Chinese Studies at the Chinese University of Hong Kong. He has served as visiting professor at the University of British Columbia, University of Victoria (BC), University of California-Los Angeles, Ecole des Hautes Etudes en Sciences Sociales in Paris, the Hong Kong University of Science and Technology, and Soka University of America. He is the recipient of Fulbright, NEH, Chiang Ching-kuo, and ACLS fellowships. He has been a fellow of the Netherlands Institute for Advanced Studies, the Nordic Institute for Asian Studies (Copenhagen), the Program in Ethnic Studies at the University of Colorado, International Institute for Asian Studies (Leiden and Amsterdam), the China Center for Comparative Politics and Economics of the Central Bureau of Compilation and Translation in Beijing, and the Peter Wall Institute for Advanced Studies of the University of British Columbia. He has been honored with distinguished adjunct professorships at the Center for Marxist Social Theory of Nanjing University, Beijing University of Language and Culture, and the Northwest University for Nationalities in Lanzhou.

Dirlik served on the editorial boards of boundary 2, Interventions (UK), China Review (Hong Kong), Asian Studies Review (Australia), China Information (The Netherlands), China Scholarship (Beijing), Cultural Studies (Beijing), Inter-Asia Cultural Studies (Taiwan and Singapore), Norwegian Journal of Migration Research, Asian Review of World Histories (South Korea), Research on Marxist Aesthetics (Nanjing), Register of Critical Theory of Society (Nanjing), International Critical Thought (Beijing), Pasaj (Passages in Literature) (Istanbul), and Contemporary Chinese Political Economy and Strategic Relations: An International Journal (Malaysia). He was the editor of two-book series, "Studies in Global Modernity" (SUNY Press) as well as co-editor of a series of  translations from prominent Chinese official intellectuals, published by Brill Publishers in the Netherlands.
Dirlik's works have been translated into Chinese, Japanese, Korean, Turkish, Bulgarian, French, German and Portuguese.

Positions and critiques
Dirlik spoke on his approach to history and the theoretical issues of historiography in a 2002 interview. As a "practicing historian" Dirlik said, "I continue to practice history not just because it is a way to make a living, which is an important consideration, but because I think that there is some value and meaning to historical understanding." He goes on to say that "I am also appalled at the arbitrary magisterial judgments on history encountered frequently in contemporary literature; a kind of licence that postmodernism seems to legitimize: since we cannot know anything, anybody can speak about everything."

The interview goes on to criticize the field of postcolonial studies, which he took up in such essays as "History Without a Center? Reflections on Eurocentrism," Prasenjit Duara in 2001 replied to Dirlik's charge that diasporic scholars from the former British colonial world had used the concepts of "postcolonialism" to become embedded in Western academic "strongholds" and that they did not represent the majority of the population in their former countries. Likewise even a sympathetic review of the field objected to Dirlik's framing of post-colonial scholars as "agents of capital."

Dirlik was also critical of the "Beijing Consensus" which presented China's economic development model as an alternative – especially for developing countries – to the Washington Consensus.  Dirlik argued that this "Silicon Valley model of development"  ignores the fact that "the exploitation of China's labor force by foreign countries was a major part of the Chinese development."

Jerry Bentley's 2005 account in the journal World History provides a cogent summary of Dirlik's critiques of the field and his own disagreement. Dirlik, he says, has leveled a "challenging critique" of the field of world history, charging that it "naturalizes capitalist globalization by turning it into human fate" and that scholarship in the field "perpetuates Eurocentric knowledge even as it seeks alternatives to Eurocentric explanations of the global past." Bentley continues that Dirlik has identified genuine problems, but has "harnessed his scholarship to a political agenda." Dirlik "overstated the problems and overgeneralized his critique," falling into the "trap of an originary fallacy," in which he "confuses origin with fate," assuming that historical scholarship must inevitably follow lines established at the foundation."

Selected publications

Books

 
 1989. The Origins of Chinese Communism, New York: Oxford University Press.
 1989. "Marxism and the Chinese  Experience:Issues in Chinese Socialism(Armonk, N.Y.: M.E. Sharpe(with Maurice Meisner)
 1990. Revolution and History: Origins of Marxist Historiography in China, 1919–1937. Berkeley: University of California Press.
 1991. Anarchism in the Chinese Revolution, Berkeley: University of California Press.
 1991. Schools into Fields and Factories: Anarchists, the Guomindang, and the National Labor University in Shanghai, 1927–1932, (with Ming Chan). Durham: Duke University Press.
 
 1994. After the Revolution: Waking to Global Capitalism, Hanover, NH: Wesleyan University Press.
 1995. "Asia-Pacific as Space of Cultural  Production,"Durham, NC: Duke University Press (with Rob Wilson)
 1997. The Postcolonial Aura: Third World Criticism in the Age of Global Capitalism, Boulder: Westview Press.
 1997. "Critical Perspectives on Mao Zedong Thought," Humanities Press(with Paul Healy and Nick Knight
 2000. "Postmodernism and China." Duke University Press
 2000. "History After the Three Worlds," Lanham, MD: Rowman and Littlefield(with Vinay Bahl and Peter Gran)
 2001. Postmodernity's Histories: The Past as Legacy and Project, Lanham, MD: Rowman and Littlefield.
 2001. "Places and Politics in the Age of Global Capital," Lanham, MD: Rowman and Littlefield(with Roxann Prazniak)
 2001. "Chinese on the American Frontier:A Reader," Lanham, MD:Rowman and Littlefield 
 2005. Marxism in the Chinese Revolution, Lanham, MD: Rowman and Littlefield.
 2006. "Pedagogies of the Global: Knowledge in the Human Interest," Paradigm Press
 2007. "Global Modernity: Modernity in the Age of Global Capitalism." Paradigm Press
 2008. "Snapshots of Intellectual Life in Contemporary PR China,"Special issue of boundary 2(35.2)
 2009. "Kriz, Kimlik, ve Siyaset: Kuresellesme Yazilari"(Crisis, Identity and Politics: Writings on Globalization),Istanbul: Iletisim Publishers
 2011. "The National Learning Revival," Special issue of China Perspectives,#1
 2011. "Culture and History in Post-Revolutionary China: The Perspective of Global Modernity"(The Liang Qichao Memorial Lectures),Chinese University of Hong Kong Press
 2012. "Sociology and Anthropology in Twentieth Century China,"Chinese University of Hong Kong Press
 2012. "Global Capitalism and the Future of Agrarian Society,"Paradigm Publishers(with Roxann Prazniak and Alexander Woodside)
 2013. "Quanqiu xiandaixing zhi chuang: Shehui kexue wenji"(Windows on Global Modernity: Social Scientific Essays),Beijing: Zhishi chanquan chuban she
 2017.  Complicities: The People's Republic of China in Global Capitalism.  Chicago: Prickly Paradigm Press.

Representative articles

"Mirror to Revolution: Early Marxist Images of Chinese History," Journal of Asian Studies, 33, 2(February 1974), pp. 193–223
"National Development and Social Revolution in Early Chinese Marxist Thought," The China Quarterly, Number 58(April–June 1974), pp. 286–309
"Mass Movements and the Left Guomindang," Modern China, 1,1(January 1975), pp. 46–74
"The Ideological Foundations of the New Life Movement: A Study in Counterrevolution," Journal of Asian Studies, 34,4(August 1975), pp. 945–980
"The Problem of Class Viewpoint versus Historicism in Chinese Historiography," Modern China, 3, 4(October 1977), pp. 465–488
"Socialism Without Revolution: The Case of Contemporary China, Pacific Affairs, 54, 4(Winter 1981–1982), pp.632–661
"Chinese Historians and the Marxist Concept of Capitalism: A Critical Examination," Modern China, 8, 1(January 1982), pp. 359–375
"Spiritual Solutions to Material Problems: The `Socialist Ethics and Courtesy Month'in China," The South Atlantic Quarterly, 81, 4(Autumn 1982), pp. 359–375
"The Predicament of Marxist Revolutionary Consciousness: Mao Zedong, Antonio Gramsci  and the Reformulation of Marxist Revolutionary Theory," Modern China, 9,2(April 1983), pp. 182–211
"The New Culture Movement Revisited: Anarchism and the Idea of  Social Revolution in New Culture Thinking," Modern China, 11,3(July 1985), pp. 251–300
 
"Culturalism as Hegemonic Ideology and Liberating Practice," Cultural Critique, Number 6(Spring 1987), pp. 13–50
"Post-socialism—Reflections on 'Socialism with Chinese Characteristics," The Bulletin of Concerned Asian Scholars, 21, 1(January 1989), pp. 33–  45
"The Postcolonial Aura: Third World Criticism in the Age of Global   Capitalism," Critical Inquiry, 20.2(Winter 1994), pp. 328–356
 
 
"Mao Zedong and 'Chinese Marxism,'" in Indira Mahalingam and Brian Carr(eds), Encyclopedia of Asian Philosophy(Routledge, 1997) 
 
 
"Place-Based Imagination: Globalism and the Politics of Place," Review XXII, 2(Spring 1999)
 
"Globalization as the End and the Beginning of History: The Contradictory Implications of a New Paradigm" (revised version), Rethinking Marxism 12.4(Winter 2000):4–22
"Markets, Power, Culture: The Making of a `Second Cultural Revolution' in China," Asian Studies Review 25.1(March 2001):1–33
"Theory, History, Culture: Cultural Identity and the Politics of Theory in Twentieth Century China," in Institute of Modern History(Academia Sinica), China and the World in the Twentieth Century(2001), pp. 95–142 
"Colonialism, Globalization and Culture: Reflections on September 11," Amerasia Journal 27.3(2001): 1–12
"Postmodernism and Chinese History," boundary 2, 28.3(Fall 2001): 19–60. 
 
"Women and the Politics of Place: A Comment," Development 45.1 (2002):14–18
"Modernity as History: Post-revolutionary China, Globalization and the Question of Modernity," Social History Vol.27 No.1 (January 2002):16–39
"Bringing History Back In: Of Diasporas, Hybridities, Places and Histories," in Elisabeth Mudimbe-Boyi(ed), Beyond Dichotomies: Histories, Identities, Cultures and the Challenge of Globalization (Albany, NY: SUNY Press, 2002), pp. 93–127
 
Review of the book One China, Many Paths edited by Chaohua Wang.
"Empire? Some Thoughts on Colonialism, Culture and Class in the Making of Global Crisis and War in Perpetuity," Interventions Vol. 5 (2)(2003):207–217
"'Where Do We Go From Here? Marxism, Modernity and Postcolonial Studies," Diaspora 12.3, Winter 2003)
"Global Modernity? Modernity in an Age of Global Capitalism," European Journal of Social Theory #3 (August 2003):275–292
 
"Spectres of the Third World: Global Modernity and the End of the Three Worlds," Third World Quarterly, 25.1 (2004): 131–147
"It is Not Where You Are From, It is Where You Are At: Place-Based Alternatives to Diaspora Discourse," in Jonathan Friedman and Shalini Randeria (ed), World on the Move: Globalization, Migration and Cultural Security (London: IB Tauris, 2004), pp. 141–165 
"Architectures of Global Modernity, Colonialism and Places," Modern Chinese Literature and Culture, 17.1 (Spring 2005): 33–61
"Globalization and National Development: The Perspective of the Chinese Revolution," in Goran Therborn and Habibul H. Khondkher(ed), Asia and Europe in Globalization: Continents, Regions and Nations (Leiden: EJ Brill, 2006), pp. 123–150
"Globalization Now and Then: Some Thoughts on Contemporary Readings of Late 19th/Early 20th Century Responses to Modernity," Journal of Modern European History, 4.2 (2006): 137–156
"Beijing Consensus: Beijing Gongshi: Who Recognizes Whom and to What End," In Yu Keping, Huang Ping, Xie Shuguang and Gao Jian (ed), Zhongguo moshi yu Beijing gongshi_: chaoyue Huashengdun gongshi (China Model and the Beijing Consensus (Beijing: Shehui kexue wenxian chubanshe, 2006), pp. 99–112
 
 
 —, Anarchism, Encyclopædia Britannica.
 "Chinese History and the Question of Orientalism" [reprint], in Edmund Burke and David Prochaska (ed), Genealogies of Orientalism: History, Theory, Politics (Lincoln, NE: University of Nebraska Press, 2008), pp. 384–413
"Race-Talk, Race and Contemporary Racism," Publication of the Modern Language Association (PMLA), special issue, "Comparative Racialization," 123.5(October 2008): 1363–1379
"The Past as Legacy and Project: Postcolonial Criticism in the Perspective of Indigenous Historicism," in Kenneth Lincoln (ed), Gathering Native Scholars: UCLA's Forty Years of American Indian Culture and Research (Los Angeles, CA: UCLA American Indian Research Center, 2009): 367–396 
"Asians on the Rim: Transnational Capital and Local Community in the Making of Contemporary Asian America," in Jean Y. W. Shen Wu and T. Chen  (ed), Asian American Studies Now: A Critical Reader (Piscataway, NJ: Rutgers University Press, 2009)
"Colonialism, Revolution, Development: A Historical Perspective on Citizenship in Political Struggles in Eastern Asia," Development and Society 29.2 (December 2010): 187–210
"Revisioning Modernity: Modernity in Eurasian Perspectives," Inter-Asia Cultural Studies, 12.2 (2011): 84–305
"The Idea of a Chinese Model: A Critical Discussion" (expanded edition), China Information, 26.3 (November 2012): 277–302
with Roxann Prazniak), "Social Justice, Democracy and the Politics of Development: The People's Republic of China in Global Perspective," International Journal of China Studies (Malaysia), 3.3 (December 2012): 285–313. 
"Transnationalization and the University: The Perspective of Global Modernity," boundary 2, 39.3 (Fall 2012): 47–73
"Thinking Modernity Historically: Is "Alternative Modernity" the Answer?" Asian Review of World Histories, 1.1 (January 2013): 5–44 
"Literary Identity/Cultural Identity: Being Chinese in the Contemporary World," Modern Chinese Literature and Culture (MCLC) Resource Center Publications (September 2013)	 
"Developmentalism: A Critique," Interventions, 16.1 (2014): 30–48
 "Asia is rising—but where is it going? Thoughts on an emergent discourse,"  Revista de Cultura, International edition #45 (2014): 12–31

Notes

References

Bibliography

External links

Peter Wall Institute for Advanced Studies - 2005 - 2006 Annual Report
Empire? Some Thoughts on Colonialism, Culture and Class in the Making of Global Crisis and War in Perpetuity
Culture against history? The politics of east asian identity
Dimensions of Chinese Anarchism: An Interview with Arif Dirlik

1940 births
2017 deaths
Turkish emigrants to the United States
Robert College alumni
University of Rochester alumni
Duke University faculty
University of Oregon faculty
Academic staff of the University of British Columbia
Academic staff of the University of Victoria
People from Mersin
Academic staff of the Hong Kong University of Science and Technology